Si, SI or si may refer to:

Arts, entertainment, and media

Literature
 Si (novel), a 2014 novel by Bob Ong
 Sí (Peruvian magazine), a magazine notable for its anti-corruption reporting
 Skeptical Inquirer, an American magazine covering topics on science and skepticism
 Sports Illustrated, an American sports magazine

Music
 Sí (Julieta Venegas album), released in 2003
 Sì (Andrea Bocelli album), released in 2018
 "Sí" (Martin Jensen song), a 2015 song
 Si (musical note), the seventh note in the traditional fixed do solfège
 Sì (operetta), an operetta by the Italian composer Pietro Mascagni
 "Sì" (Gigliola Cinquetti song), the Italian entry to the Eurovision Song Contest 1974
Si (Zaz song), 2013
 Sí, a 2013 Spanish album by Malú
 "Sì", a 1985 song released by Italian actress Carmen Russo

Other uses in arts, entertainment, and media
 Si (film), original title of the 2010 South Korean film Poetry

Enterprises and organisations

Computing
 Swiss Informatics Society, a Swiss organization of computer science educators, researchers, and professionals
 The SI, a former name of the American defense contractor Vencore

Education
 St. Ignatius College Preparatory, a Jesuit high school in San Francisco, California, US
 Silay Institute, a private college in the Philippines

Government
 Si, a South Korean administrative unit
 Survey of India, an Indian government agency responsible for managing geographical information
 Swedish Institute (Svenska institutet), a Swedish government agency which promotes Sweden abroad

Politics
 Sarekat Islam, a socio-political organization in Indonesia under Dutch colonial rule
 Catalan Solidarity for Independence, a Catalan political party
 Situationist International, an organization of social revolutionaries
 Socialist International, a worldwide organization of political parties
 Solidarity and Equality, an Argentine political party (Spanish: Solidaridad e Igualdad)

Transportation
 Blue Islands (IATA airline code, SI)
 Skynet Airlines (IATA airline code SI, ceased operating 2004)
 Spokane International Railroad (reporting mark SI), a former railway in Washington, US

Other enterprises and organizations
 Samahang Ilokano, a fraternity/sorority based in the Philippines
 SÍ Sørvágur, a Faroese sports association
 Society of Indexers, a professional society based in the UK
 Sports Interactive, a British computer games development company

People with the name
 Si (surname), a Chinese surname
 Si (given name)

Places
 Mount Si, a mountain in the U.S. state of Washington
 Province of Siena (postal code and vehicle registration plate code)
 Si County, Anhui, China
 Si River, in China
 Slovenia's ISO 3166-2 code

Science and technology

Biology and healthcare
 Sacroiliac, an anatomical abbreviation for the sacroiliac (joint)
 Self-injury, intentional, direct injuring
 Shock index, a measurement used to determine if a person is suffering shock
 Suicidal ideation, recurrent thoughts or ideas about ending one's own life

Chemistry
 si, a chemical descriptor; See prochirality
 Silicon, symbol Si, a chemical element

Computing and Internet

 .si, the Internet country code top-level domain for Slovenia
 Shift In, an ASCII control character
 SI register, or source index, in X86 computer architecture
 Swarm intelligence, an artificial intelligence technique
 Synthetic intelligence, an alternate term for or a form of artificial intelligence

Motor vehicles
 Honda Civic Si, an automobile
 Spark-ignition engine, a type of internal combustion engine

Other uses in science and technology
 International System of Units (Système international d'unités, abbreviated SI), the modern international standard version of the metric system
 Signal integrity, electronic circuit tools and techniques that ensure electrical signals are of sufficient quality
 Sine integral, Si(x)
 Spectral interferometry, attosecond physics technique

Titles and ranks
 Si, a Maghrebi Arabic variant of Sidi, a title of respect
 Si, a variant of the Thai honorific Sri
 Station inspector, a rank in the Singapore Police Force
 Sub-inspector, a rank in Indian Police forces

Other uses
 Statutory instrument (UK), abbreviated SI, the principal form in which delegated legislation is made in Great Britain
 Sì (dessert), a Chinese dessert
 Sídhe or Si, Celtic mythological beings
 si, the Sinhala language ISO 639 alpha-2 code
 Supplemental instruction, an academic support program often used in higher education

See also
 S1 (disambiguation)